Here is a list of the award winners and the films for which they won.

References

Stardust Awards
Lifetime achievement awards